Saber Didehvar (born 26 December 1995 in Dehdasht) is an Iranian footballer who played as a left midfielder or left back for Al-Bahri in the Iraqi Premier League.

He made his first Persian Gulf Pro League debut on 9 December 2016 against Saba Qom.

Club career statistics 

Last Update:9 December 2016

References

1995 births
Living people
Iranian footballers
Association football defenders
Association football midfielders
Persian Gulf Pro League players
Sepahan S.C. footballers
People from Kohgiluyeh and Boyer-Ahmad Province
Iranian expatriate footballers
Expatriate footballers in Iraq
Iranian expatriates in Iraq
Iranian expatriate sportspeople in Iraq